Cyathula prostrata, the prostrate pastureweed, is a perennial, prostrate, herbaceous plant distributed throughout the tropical and subtropical world.

Etymology and names

Etymology
Cyathula: sy-ATH-uh-la - small cup.
prostrata: prost-RAY-tuh - prostrate.

Names

, ರಕ್ತಪಮರ್ಗ (raktapamarga)

Source:

Distribution and habitat

Native range
Africa: Benin, Burkina, The Gambia, Ghana, Guinea, Guinea-Bissau, Ivory Coast, Liberia, Mali, Nigeria, Senegal, Sierra Leone, Togo, Cameroon, Central African Republic, Congo, Equatorial Guinea, Gabon, Gulf of Guinea Is., Zaïre, Ethiopia, Sudan, Tanzania, Uganda, Angola, Malawi, Mozambique, Zambia, Zimbabwe, Madagascar.
Asia-Temperate: China South-Central, China Southeast, Hainan, Taiwan.
Asia-Tropical: Assam, Bangladesh, East Himalaya, India, Nepal, Sri Lanka, Cambodia, Laos, Myanmar, Thailand, Vietnam, Borneo, Jawa, Lesser Sunda Islands, Peninsular Malaysia, Maluku, Philippines, Singapore, Sulawesi, Sumatera, Bismarck Archipelago, New Guinea, Solomon Is.
Pacific: Caroline Is.
Source:

Introduced range
Bolivia, Caroline Is., Cook Is., French Guiana, Guyana, Jamaica, Leeward Is., Marquesas, Mauritius, Puerto Rico, Réunion, Seychelles, Society Is., Suriname, Trinidad-Tobago, Tubuai Is., Venezuelan Antilles, Windward Is.

Description
Habit : Perennial, prostrate herbs.
Leaves : Opposite, rhomboid, acute at both ends, thinly pubescent; petiolate.
Inflorescence : Spike terminal, slender, solitary or in group of three.
Flowers : In groups of 3-5 of which one perfect and others neuter; bracts and bracteoles similar, lanceolate, acuminate, pubescent; tepals 5, free, elliptic, acute, hooked awn like in neutor flowers.
Androecium : Stamens 5, filaments united into a membranous truncate cup; staminodes membranous, alternate with stamens, fimbriate.
Gynoecium : Ovary ovoid, style simple, stigma capitellate.
Fruits : Achenes, obovoid, compressed, golden brown.
Flowering and fruiting : September-April.

Varieties
Cyathula prostrata var. prostrata
Cyathula prostrata var. lancifolia - Philippines.
Cyathula prostrata var. pedicellata - Tropical Africa.

Uses and ecology
The plant is locally used as a medicine but also as a food and source of soap. It is also recorded as a larval host plant of Fulvous Pied Flat butterfly.

References

Amaranthaceae